This is a list of electoral results for the Electoral district of Albert Park in Victorian state elections from 1889 to the present.

Members for Albert Park

Election results

Elections in the 2020s

Elections in the 2010s

Elections in the 2000s

Elections in the 1990s

Elections in the 1980s

Elections in the 1970s

Elections in the 1960s

The two candidate preferred vote was not counted between the Labor and DLP candidates for Albert Park.

Elections in the 1950s

Elections in the 1940s 

|- style="background-color:#E9E9E9"
! colspan="6" style="text-align:left;" |After distribution of preferences

 Preferences were not distributed to completion.

Elections in the 1930s

 Two party preferred vote was estimated.

Elections in the 1920s

 Two party preferred vote was estimated.

Elections in the 1910s

 Preferences were not distributed.

 Two party preferred votes were estimated.

References

 

Victoria (Australia) state electoral results by district